Boron (5B) naturally occurs as isotopes  and , the latter of which makes up about 80% of natural boron.

List of isotopes 

|-
| ?
| style="text-align:center" | 5
| style="text-align:center" | 1
| 
| p-unstable
| 2p?
| ?
| 2−#
|
|
|-
| 
| style="text-align:center" | 5
| style="text-align:center" | 2
| 
| []
| p
| 
| (3/2−)
|
|
|-
| 
| style="text-align:center" | 5
| style="text-align:center" | 3
| 
| 
| β+α
| 
| 2+
|
|
|-
| style="text-indent:1em" | 
| colspan="3" style="text-indent:2em" | 
| 
| 
| 
| 0+
|
|
|-
| 
| style="text-align:center" | 5
| style="text-align:center" | 4
| 
| 
| p
| | 
| 3/2−
|
|
|-
| 
| style="text-align:center" | 5
| style="text-align:center" | 5
| 
| colspan=3 align=center|Stable
| 3+
| colspan=2 align=center|[, ]
|-
| 
| style="text-align:center" | 5
| style="text-align:center" | 6
| 
| colspan=3 align=center|Stable
| 3/2−
| colspan=2 align=center|[, ]
|-
| style="text-indent:1em" | 
| colspan="3" style="text-indent:2em" | 
| 
| 
| 
| 1/2+, (3/2+)
|
|
|-
| rowspan=2|
| rowspan=2 style="text-align:center" | 5
| rowspan=2 style="text-align:center" | 7
| rowspan=2|
| rowspan=2|
| β−
| 
| rowspan=2|1+
| rowspan=2|
| rowspan=2|
|-
| β−α
| 
|-
| rowspan=2|
| rowspan=2 style="text-align:center" | 5
| rowspan=2 style="text-align:center" | 8
| rowspan=2|
| rowspan=2|
| β−
| 
| rowspan=2|3/2−
| rowspan=2|
| rowspan=2|
|-
| β−n
| 
|-
| rowspan=3|
| rowspan=3 style="text-align:center" | 5
| rowspan=3 style="text-align:center" | 9
| rowspan=3|
| rowspan=3|
| β−
| 
| rowspan=3|2−
| rowspan=3|
| rowspan=3|
|-
| β−n
| 
|-
| β−2n ?
|  ?
|-
| style="text-indent:1em" | 
| colspan="3" style="text-indent:2em" | 
| 
| IT ?
| 
| 0+
|
|
|-
| rowspan=3|
| rowspan=3 style="text-align:center" | 5
| rowspan=3 style="text-align:center" | 10
| rowspan=3|
| rowspan=3|
| β−n
| 
| rowspan=3|3/2−
| rowspan=3|
| rowspan=3|
|-
| β− (< )
| 
|-
| β−2n (< )
| 
|-
| 
| style=text-align:center | 5
| style=text-align:center | 11
| 
| > 
| n ?
|  ?
| 0−
|
|
|-
| rowspan=5|
| rowspan=5 style=text-align:center | 5
| rowspan=5 style=text-align:center | 12
| rowspan=5|
| rowspan=5|
| β−n
| 
| rowspan=5|(3/2−)
| rowspan=5|
| rowspan=5|
|-
| β−
| 
|-
| β−2n
| 
|-
| β−3n
| 
|-
| β−4n
| 
|-
| 
| style=text-align:center | 5
| style=text-align:center | 13
| 
| < 
| n
| 
| (2−)
|
|
|-
| rowspan=4|
| rowspan=4 style=text-align:center | 5
| rowspan=4 style=text-align:center | 14
| rowspan=4|
| rowspan=4|
| β−n
| 
| rowspan=4|(3/2−)
| rowspan=4|
| rowspan=4|
|-
| β−2n
| 
|-
| β−3n (< )
| 
|-
| β− (> )
| 
|-
| 
| style=text-align:center | 5
| style=text-align:center | 15
| 
| > 
| n
| 
| (1−, 2−)
|
|
|-
| 
| style=text-align:center | 5
| style=text-align:center | 16
| 
| > 
| 2n
| 
| (3/2−)
|
|

 Neutrinos from boron-8 beta decays within the Sun are an important background to dark matter direct detection experiments.  They are the first component of the neutrino floor that dark matter direct detection experiments are expected to eventually encounter.

Applications

Boron-10
Boron-10 is used in boron neutron capture therapy as an experimental treatment of some brain cancers.

References 

 
Boron
Boron

https://borates.today/isotopes-a-comprehensive-guide/#:~:text=Boron%20isotope%20elements%20with%20masses,11%20mostly%20decay%20into%20carbon.